The 2014 season is Persija's 81st competitive season. Persija was finished in fifth but they didn't enter to second round. In this season, Ramdani Lestaluhu was showing his great potential with 8 goals.

Season overview
In the 2014 season, Persija are in the western group of ISL 2014 and coached by Benny Dollo and Fabiano Beltrame is the team captain. Persija doesn't have a striker who is quite satisfactory despite being filled by Ivan Bošnjak who had played for Croatia in World Cup 2006.

Squad information

First team squad

Pre-season

Inter Island Cup

Java Group 2

Matches

Competitions

Overview 
{| class="wikitable" style="text-align: center"
|-
!rowspan=2|Competition
!colspan=8|Record
!rowspan=2|Started round
!rowspan=2|Final position / round
!rowspan=2|First match	
!rowspan=2|Last match
|-
!
!
!
!
!
!
!
!
|-
| Indonesia Super League

| —
| 5th
| 1 February 2014
| 5 September 2014
|-
! Total

League table

Matches

Indonesia Super League

See also
 2014 Indonesia Super League

References

Persija Jakarta
Persija Jakarta seasons